Tetraethylammonium bromide (TEAB) is a quaternary ammonium compound with the chemical formula  C8H20N+Br−, often written as "Et4N+Br−" in the chemical literature. It has been used as the source of tetraethylammonium ions in pharmacological and physiological studies, but is also used in organic chemical synthesis.

Chemistry

Synthesis
TEAB is commercially available, but can be prepared by the reaction between tetraethylammonium hydroxide and hydrobromic acid:

Et4N+HO− + HBr → Et4N+Br− + H2O

Evaporation of the water and recrystallization from acetonitrile yields a crystalline sample of TEAB.

Structure
The crystal structure of TEAB has been determined and found to exhibit a distorted tetrahedral symmetry with respect to the geometry of the C atoms around the central N.

Synthetic applications
Examples include:

 TEAB catalyzes the high-yield oxidation of organic sulfides to sulfoxides by o-iodoxybenzoic acid (IBX) in chloroform/water at room temperature, e.g.
(C2H5)2S → (C2H5)2S=O

 TEAB has been used for the in situ preparation of tetraethylammonium superoxide from potassium superoxide for the conversion of primary alkyl halides to dialkyl peroxides. The overall reaction is:
2R1Br + 2KO2 → R1-O-O-R1 + 2KBr + O2

Biology
In common with  tetraethylammonium chloride and  tetraethylammonium iodide, TEAB has been used as a source of tetraethylammonium ions for numerous clinical and pharmacological studies, which are covered in more detail under the entry for tetraethylammonium. Briefly, TEAB has been explored clinically for its ganglionic blocking properties, although it is now essentially obsolete as a drug, and it is still used in physiological research for its ability to block K+ channels in various tissues.

Toxicity
The toxicity of TEAB is primarily due to the tetraethylammonium ion, which has been studied extensively. The acute toxicity of TEAB is comparable to that of tetraethylammonium chloride and tetraethylammonium iodide. These data, taken from a study by Randall and co-workers, are provided for comparative purposes; additional details may be found in the entry for Tetraethylammonium.

LD50 for mouse: 38 mg/kg, i.v.; 60 mg/kg, i.p.; >2000 mg/kg, p.o.

See also
Tetraethylammonium
Tetraethylammonium chloride
Tetraethylammonium iodide

References

Tetraethylammonium salts
Bromides